D.M.Z. is the debut studio album by American punk rock band DMZ, released in 1978 by record label Sire.

Track listing
Mighty Idy	2:25
Bad Attitude	3:00
Watch For Me Girl	2:20
Cinderella	2:45
Don't Jump Me Mother	3:22
Destroyer	2:15
Baby Boom	2:20
Out Of Our Tree	3:00
Border Line	2:35
Do Not Enter	2:15
From Home	1:35

References

External links 
 

1978 debut albums
DMZ (band) albums